"One Bad Apple" is a song by the Osmonds, released as a single on November 14, 1970. It debuted on the Billboard Hot 100 on January 2, 1971. It hit the top of the chart on February 13, 1971 and stayed there for five weeks. It also reached No. 6 on the R&B chart. Billboard ranked it as the No. 4 song for 1971. Both "One Bad Apple" and the Donny Osmond-credited single "Sweet and Innocent" are on the 1970 album Osmonds.  It was certified Gold by the RIAA on February 4, 1971.

The song was written by George Jackson, who originally had the Jackson 5 in mind when he wrote it. According to Donny Osmond, Michael Jackson later told him that the Jackson 5 almost recorded this song first, but chose to record "ABC" instead. Rick Hall recorded and produced the song at his FAME Studios in Muscle Shoals; to determine who would sing lead, he lined up all of the brothers (including Jimmy) and had each one sing the opening line, choosing Merrill and Donny. Ultimately, songs led primarily by Merrill would be released as being by the Osmonds, while those by Donny would be released under Donny's name (with the brothers still accompanying him). Curb then brought it to Terry Manning in Memphis to mix.

"One Bad Apple" was also used as the theme to The Osmonds cartoon show on ABC-TV. It is the only song in the Osmonds' repertoire that continues to receive any appreciable airplay on oldies radio, and even then its airplay is much lower than comparable hits of the era (most of the Osmonds' other songs get no airplay at all).

Charts

Weekly charts

Year-end charts

All-time charts

Certifications

References

External links
 Lyrics of this song
 

1970 songs
1970 singles
Songs written by George Jackson (songwriter)
The Osmonds songs
Aaron Carter songs
Billboard Hot 100 number-one singles
Cashbox number-one singles
MGM Records singles